The Trofeo Costa del Sol is a basketball friendly competition, held in the county of Costa de Sol of the Málaga province in Spain.

The competition inaugurated in 2012 and continued to be one of the competitions played before the upcoming season of the Liga ACB. Before 2015, only teams that play in ACB can join the competition. But since then, other EuroLeague teams can take part in the competition.

Performance by club

References

Costa del Sol Trophy
Basketball in Spain
Basketball cup competitions in Spain